The following is a list of the complete output of solo piano works composed by Franz Schubert.

Quick reference 

Legend to the table:

✍ indicates a direct link to the manuscript at the Schubert-Autographs website by the Austrian Academy of Sciences

♫ indicates a direct link to the score at International Music Score Library Project (IMSLP)

For the Piano Sonatas: there is no uniform numbering of the sonatas. The Deutsch catalogue does not number the sonatas. In the Neue Schubert-Ausgabe the sonatas are also not numbered. There are several issues which make the numbering difficult: e.g. which of the incomplete sketches are to be included?... in what order are they to be presented?... The current list retains the following numbering systems:
 15 sonatas — numbering of the piano sonatas according to Franz Schubert's Werke: Kritisch durchgesehene Gesammtausgabe – Serie 10: Sonaten für Pianoforte (Leipzig: Breitkopf & Härtel, 1888), the first publication that claimed to print the complete set of Schubert's piano sonatas. The Deutsch catalogue was yet to be created, so there are no Deutsch numbers in the original 1888 publication. This edition is reprinted from 1970 on by Dover Publications. IMSLP has facsimiles of many of the sonatas according to this first edition, including the numbering X,1 — X,2 — etc. on the score.
n 19 sonatas, numbering according to the Neue Schubert-Ausgabe, Series VII/2, volume 1–3.
 21 sonatas — numbering of Schubert's piano sonatas as most encountered on recordings etc., for instance on the Schubert page at Classical Archives. Also IMSLP follows this numbering for their page names of Schubert's piano sonatas. Wiener Urtext Edition follows the same numbering, except that Op. 122 is No. 8, the ensuing D. 571, 575, 613 and 625 all shift up one number, and D. 655 is an unnumbered fragment.
Note that in Schubert's lifetime "Fantasie" (Fantasy) and "Sonate" (Sonata) had a somewhat overlapping meaning: by convention the Wanderer Fantasy was never numbered as a sonata, while , first published as a Fantasie, always was.

Other columns in the table:
Op.: Opus number, "(p)" or "posth." indicates a posthumous publication.
D.: Deutsch number; between square brackets: former Deutsch number

Table
 Completed numbered sonata  Unfinished

Complete list
The table includes the following information: 
 D – the catalogue number assigned by Otto Erich Deutsch or NSA authorities
 Former Deutsch Number – information on Deutsch numbers that have been re-assigned, when applicable; listed in "[...]"
 Opus Number – the opus number of the original publication of the work, when applicable; "(p)" or "posth." indicates a posthumous publication
 English Title – The title of the work in an English translation from German
 Informal Title – any additional names by which the work is known, when applicable
 Original Title – The title of the work in German as it appears in the Deutsch catalogue or the Neue Schubert-Ausgabe
 Autograph Link – ✍ a direct link to the manuscript at the Schubert-Autographs website by the Austrian Academy of Sciences
 Score Link – ♫ a direct link to the score at the International Music Score Library Project (IMSLP) website
 Date – the known or assumed date of composition, when available; or date of publication
 Numbering Systems of Piano Sonatas – the numbering of the piano sonatas as listed in the Breitkopf & Härtel and Wiener Urtext Editions, described above
 Version – the number of versions as it pertains to works that have more than one version of the same work/movement
 Notes – any additional information concerning the work: alternate titles, listing of movements or numbers, tempo markings, completeness, relation to other works, authorship, etc.

Scores
Schubert-Autographs by Austrian Academy of Sciences
Category:Schubert, Franz at IMSLP
Franz Schubert's Werke: Kritisch durchgesehene Gesammtausgabe (= Alte Gesamtausgabe = AGA):
Julius Epstein (ed.) Serie 10: Sonaten für Pianoforte. Leipzig: Breitkopf & Härtel, 1888.
(replication): Franz Schubert. Complete Sonatas for Pianoforte Solo. New York: Dover Publications, 1970. 
Julius Epstein (ed.) Serie 11: Phantasie, Impromptus und andere Stücke für Pianoforte. Leipzig: Breitkopf & Härtel, 1888.
Julius Epstein (ed.) Serie 12: Tänze für Pianoforte. Leipzig: Breitkopf & Härtel, 1889
Eusebius Mandyczewski (ed.) Serie 21: Supplement: Instrumentalmusik; Gesangsmusik. Leipzig: Breitkopf & Härtel, 1897.
Julius Epstein, Eusebius Mandyczewski (eds.) Revisionsbericht - Serie X: Sonaten für Pianoforte. Leipzig: Breitkopf & Härtel, 1893
Julius Epstein, Eusebius Mandyczewski (eds.) Revisionsbericht - Serie XI: Phantasie, Impromptus und andere Stücke für Pianoforte. Leipzig: Breitkopf & Härtel, 1894
 Revisionsbericht - Serie XII: Tänze für Pianoforte. Leipzig: Breitkopf & Härtel
 Revisionsbericht - Serie XXI: Supplement. Leipzig: Breitkopf & Härtel
Henle (Urtext Edition):
Paul Mies (ed.) Piano Sonatas, Volume I. 1971.
Paul Mies (ed.) Piano Sonatas, Volume II. 1973.
Paul Badura-Skoda (ed.) Piano Sonatas, Volume III (Early and Unfinished Sonatas). 1997.
Walter Gieseking (ed.) Impromptus and Moments musicaux. 1948.
Paul Mies (ed.) 3 Piano Pieces (Impromptus) Op. posth. D 946. 1976.
Gertraut Haberkamp (ed.) Piano Pieces - Piano Variations. 1992.
Paul Mies (ed.) Complete Dances, Volume I and Volume II. 1982.
Wiener Urtext Edition:
Martino Tirimo (ed.) Franz Schubert: The Complete Piano Sonatas. 1997.
 Vol. 1 ISMN 979-0-50057-223-7 
 Vol. 2 ISMN 979-0-50057-224-4 
 Vol. 3 ISMN 979-0-50057-225-1 
 Paul Badura-Skoda (ed.)
 Franz Schubert: Fantasy C major "Wanderer-Fantasie" ISMN 979-0-50057-009-7 
 Franz Schubert: Impromptus, Moments musicaux, Three Piano Pieces ISMN 979-0-50057-000-4 
 Alexander Weinmann (ed.) Franz Schubert: The Complete Dances for Piano
 Vol. 1 ISMN 979-0-50057-020-2 
 Vol. 2 ISMN 979-0-50057-021-9 
Franz Schubert: Neue Ausgabe sämtlicher Werke (= Neue Gesamtausgabe = NGA = Neue Schubert-Ausgabe = NSA = New Schubert Edition = NSE):
Walburga Litschauer (ed). Series VII Part 2 Volume 1: Klaviersonaten I. Kassel: Bärenreiter, 2000. ISMN 9790006497119
Walburga Litschauer (ed). Series VII Part 2 Volume 2: Klaviersonaten II. Kassel: Bärenreiter, 2003. ISMN 9790006497195
Walburga Litschauer (ed). Series VII Part 2 Volume 3: Klaviersonaten III. Kassel: Bärenreiter, 1996. ISMN 9790006472475
David Goldberger (ed). Series VII Part 2 Volume 4: Klavierstücke I. Kassel: Bärenreiter, 1988. ISMN 9790006472208
Christa Landon and Walther Dürr (eds). Series VII Part 2 Volume 5: Klavierstücke II. Kassel: Bärenreiter, 1984. ISMN 9790006472161
Walburga Litschauer (ed). Series VII Part 2 Volume 6: Tänze I. Kassel: Bärenreiter, 1989. ISMN 9790006472246
Walburga Litschauer (ed). Series VII Part 2 Volume 7a: Tänze II. Kassel: Bärenreiter, 1990. ISMN 9790006472277
Alfred Mann (ed). Series VIII Volume 2: Schuberts Studien. Kassel: Bärenreiter, 1986. ISMN 9790006472192

References

Lists of (piano) compositions by Schubert
 Otto Erich Deutsch.  Franz Schubert, thematisches Verzeichnis seiner Werke in chronologischer Folge (New Schubert Edition Series VIII Supplement, Volume 4). Kassel: Bärenreiter, 1978. ISMN 9790006305148 – 
Aderhold, Werner (ed.) Franz Schubert: Deutsch-Verzeichnis – Studienausgabe. Kassel: Bärenreiter, 2012. ISMN 9790006315864 – 
Franz Schubert, Thematisches Verzeichnis seiner Werke in chronologischer Folge on-line copy at archive.org
 Schubert Database by Neue Schubert-Ausgabe
 List of works by Franz Schubert at International Music Score Library Project
  Franz Schubert Catalogue: 610 - Oeuvres pour piano at 
  Franz SCHUBERT: Catalogo delle composizioni at

Other sources
Eva Badura-Skoda and Peter Branscombe. Schubert Studies: Problems of Style and Chronology. Cambridge University Press, 1982.
Brian Newbould. Schubert: The Music and the Man. University of California Press, 1999.  
 Reinhard Van Hoorickx. "Franz Schubert (1797–1828) List of the Dances in Chronological Order" in Revue belge de Musicologie/Belgisch Tijdschrift voor Muziekwetenschap, Vol. 25, No. 1/4, pp. 68–97, 1971
Reinhard Van Hoorickx. "Thematic Catalogue of Schubert's Works: New Additions, Corrections and Notes" in Revue belge de Musicologie/Belgisch Tijdschrift voor Muziekwetenschap, Vol. 28/30, pp. 136–171, 1974—1976.

External links
Franz Schubert 31.1.1797 - 19.11.1828
Bärenreiter-Verlag: New Schubert Edition
Neue Schubert-Ausgabe

Piano solo